Fu Qiping is a leader and environmentalist who changed the structure of the economy of a village named Tengtou in China. He received Asia's most prestigious award, the Ramon Magsaysay Award, for his work.

References

Ramon Magsaysay Award winners
Chinese environmentalists
Living people
Year of birth missing (living people)